Westbrook Public Schools is the school district created to serve the public education needs of Westbrook, Connecticut.

Westbrook's district has three schools located on two different campuses, the middle and high schools being attached.

The school district comprises one elementary school serving grades PK-4:
 Daisy Ingraham Elementary School 

There is one middle school serving grades 5-8:
 Westbrook Middle School 

And one high school serving grades 9-12:
 Westbrook High School

References

External links 
 The Westbrook Public Schools website

School districts in Connecticut
Education in Middlesex County, Connecticut